A snowstorm is a weather system responsible for significant snowfall over a region.

Snowstorm may also refer to:

Places
Snowstorm, California, USA; former name of Termo, California
Snowstorm Mountains, Elko County, Nevada, USA; a mountain range

Literature
The Snowstorm: A Christmas Story, a book by Catherine Gore
The Snow-Storm (poem), poem by Ralph Waldo Emerson
 The Snowstorm (short story), an 1856 short story by Leo Tolstoy
 The Blizzard (aka The Snowstorm), an 1830 short story by Aleksandr Pushkin

Music
Snowstorm (band), a rock band in Gothenburg, Sweden
"Snowstorm", a song by Galaxie 500 from their 1989 album On Fire
"Snowstorm", a song by Wintersleep from their 2003 album Wintersleep
Snowstorm Records, a record label featuring acts such as Chris T-T

Other uses
Buran (spacecraft), a Soviet space shuttle
SnowStorm, a popular game on Habbo Hotel
"Snowstorm toy", also known as snow globe
Snow Storm: Steam-Boat off a Harbour's Mouth (painting), an 1842 artwork by British painter Joseph Mallord William Turner
Snow Storm: Hannibal and his Army Crossing the Alps (painting), an 1812 artwork British painter Joseph Mallord William Turner
Snowstorm (Starsky and Hutch episode), a 1975 TV episode of Starsky and Hutch
Snow Storm (G.I. Joe), a fictional character in the G.I. Joe universe
Snowstorm (film), a 1977 Yugoslav film directed by Antun Vrdoljak

See also

 
 
 Northeast Snowfall Impact Scale
 List of Northeast Snowfall Impact Scale winter storms
 Nor'easter
 Thundersnow
 Big Snow (disambiguation)
 Blizzard (disambiguation)
 Winter storm (disambiguation)